The Greatest Hits is a Greatest hits album by rapper Juvenile. It was released on October 19, 2004 through Cash Money Records.

Track listing
 "Intro" – 2:121
 "Slow Motion" (featuring Soulja Slim) – 4:084
 "Ha" – 4:521
 "Back That Azz Up" (featuring Mannie Fresh & Lil Wayne) – 4:251
 "Set It Off" – 4:173
 "In My Life" (featuring Mannie Fresh) – 5:444
 "Slow Motion (Remix)" (featuring Wyclef Jean & Ying Yang Twins) – 4:085
 "Back That Thang Up" (featuring Mannie Fresh & Lil Wayne) – 4:325
 "Bounce Back" (featuring Baby a.k.a. "The Birdman") – 4:134
 "U Understand" – 4:192
 "Mamma Got Ass" – 4:273
 "400 Degreez" – 4:091
 "I Got That Fire" (featuring Mannie Fresh) – 4:282
 "Juvenile on Fire" – 4:561
 "Rich Niggaz" (featuring Turk, Lil Wayne, Paparue & Mannie Fresh) – 5:031
 "Never Had Shit" (featuring Big Tymers, B.G. & Turk) – 4:132
 "Lil' Boyz" (featuring Big Tymers & Lil Wayne) – 4:122
 "Follow Me Now" – 3:551

1 from 400 Degreez (1998) 
2 from Tha G-Code (1999) 
3 from Project English (2001) 
4 from Juve the Great (2003) 
5 from no album

References

Juvenile (rapper) albums
Albums produced by Mannie Fresh
2004 greatest hits albums
Cash Money Records compilation albums
Gangsta rap compilation albums